Krishna Canal Junction railway station (station code:KCC) is an Indian Railways station in Tadepalle which is part of Mangalagiri Tadepalle Municipal Corporation and a satellite station of Vijayawada in Andhra Pradesh. It is administered by Vijayawada Railway Division of South Coast Railway zone and situated on New Delhi–Chennai, Howrah–Chennai main line. The station is the terminus for Guntur–Krishna Canal section. It is categorized as a Non-Suburban Grade-6 (NSG-6) station in the division. It is one of the 27 rural stations in the state to have Wi-Fi.

History 
Between 1893 and 1896,  of the East Coast State Railway, between Vijayawada and Cuttack was opened for traffic. The southern part of the East Coast State Railway (from Waltair to Vijayawada) was taken over by Madras Railway in 1901.

As there was no railway bridge across the Krishna River, the trains from the South were terminated at this railway station and those from the North were terminated at Vijayawada railway station. The goods and passengers were transferred between the Vijayawada and Krishna Canal railway stations through barges.

Classification 
In terms of earnings and outward passengers handled, Krishna Canal is categorized as a Non-Suburban Grade-6 (NSG-6) railway station. Based on the re–categorization of Indian Railway stations for the period of 2017–18 and 2022–23, an NSG–6 category station earns nearly  crore and handles close to  passengers.

References 

Railway stations in Guntur district
Vijayawada railway division
Railway junction stations in Andhra Pradesh
Transport in Guntur